Compsa monrosi is a species of beetle in the family Cerambycidae. It was described by Prosen in 1961.

References

Neoibidionini
Beetles described in 1961